Tom Leahy may refer to:
 Tom Leahy (footballer) (1888–1964), Australian rules footballer for Norwood, South Australia
 Tommy Leahy (footballer) (1870–1916), Australian rules footballer for Essendon
 Tommy Leahy (Kilkenny hurler) (1907–1978), Irish hurler
 Tom Leahy (hurler) (born 1964), Irish hurler for Kilkenny
 Tom Leahy (baseball) (1869–1951), American baseball player
 Tom Leahy (athlete), Paralympic athlete from Ireland
 Tommy Leahy (Tipperary hurler) (1905–1981), Irish hurler
 Tom Leahy, Jr., played Major Astro on Major Astro, a children's television show in Wichita, Kansas
 Thomas Leahy, pioneer in early Cedar Mill, Oregon